Easynote is a web-based project management tool created by Made Solutions International in 2016. Easynote was acquired in 2020 (August) and is today owned by Easynote AB and the company is based in Malmö, Sweden.

Since the tool's release, it's been offered to users free of charge, freemium and is designed for both personal and collaborative use. The software can be used by small, medium and large enterprise companies.

History 
Easynote was created by Made Solutions International founder Mensur Zahirović, a Bosnian-Swedish developer and tech entrepreneur. Zahirović's previous enterprises included an e-commerce company, and Cmok.net, a social network and dating site in Bosnia and Herzegovina.

The tool launched in March 2016. The site surpassed 5,000 users in January 2017, seven months after its initial release. Easynote has seen almost a three-fold increase in registrations over a six month period and has 14,900 users, as of July 2017. As of June 2020, Easynote is having more than 60,000 users. 

In July 2017, Easynote announced that it's been accepted to exhibit at Web Summit 2017 technology conference, which will take place in Lisbon in November 2017.

Easynote AB has announced that it's rebuilding Easynote from scratch, to launch the next generation productivity tool and that will be launched in 2021.

Features 
Easynote has been designed to be able to manage day-to-day tasks with no user training required. Projects are nominated as todo lists, which contain tasks and subtasks. Tasks can be assigned to different members, and users are able to set deadlines, change statuses and assign levels of urgency. Checklists and an Activity map are used to monitor the creation, progression and completion of todo lists and tasks.

Architecture 
Easynote was developed with such Open Source technologies as PHP, MYSQL, APACHE and Jquery.

The next generation of Easynote, has been rebuilt from scratch and is being built on Node.js, Vue.js, Elasticsearch & Socket.io

References

External links 
 Official Website